Stefan Tomović (born 14 October 2001) is a Serbian football attacking midfielder who plays for Čukarički.

References

External links
 
 
 
 

2001 births
Living people
Association football midfielders
Serbian footballers
Serbian SuperLiga players
FK Proleter Novi Sad players
FK Čukarički players
People from Kruševac